Huang Shaohua (born 1984-01-31 in Nanning, Guangxi) is a Chinese swimmer, who competed for Team China at the 2008 Summer Olympics.

Major achievements
2000 Guangxi Regional Games - 1st 100 m free;
2002 Asian Games - 1st 4×100 m free relay;
2003 National Intercity Games - 1st 100 m free;
2003 World Championships - 8th 4×200 m free relay;
2004 National Champions Tournament & Olympic Selective Trials - 2nd 100 m/200 m free;
2005 National Games - 2nd 100 m free

Records
2008 National Champions Tournament - 3:17.9, 4×100 m free relay (AR)

References
http://2008teamchina.olympic.cn/index.php/personview/personsen/1284

1984 births
Living people
Olympic swimmers of China
People from Nanning
Swimmers from Guangxi
Swimmers at the 2008 Summer Olympics
Asian Games medalists in swimming
Swimmers at the 2002 Asian Games
Swimmers at the 2006 Asian Games
Asian Games gold medalists for China
Asian Games silver medalists for China
Medalists at the 2002 Asian Games
Medalists at the 2006 Asian Games
Chinese male freestyle swimmers
21st-century Chinese people